Shifandaxue is a station on Line 2 of the Shenyang Metro. The station opened on 30 December 2013. The station is named for the nearby Shenyang Normal University.

Station Layout

References 

Railway stations in China opened in 2013
Shenyang Metro stations